CRRC Nanjing Puzhen is a Chinese railway rolling stock manufacturer, based in Puzhen, Nanjing city. It is a subsidiary of CRRC. Nanjing Puzhen has supplied trains to Shanghai Metro Line 3 and Nanjing Metro in partnership with Alstom.

India's Mumbai Metro One Private Limited (MMOPL) is also using rolling stock manufactured by Nanjing Puzhen.

Currently Puzhen is delivering 58 4-car trains to Siemens for the Klang Valley Mass Rapid Transit Project in Kuala Lumpur, Malaysia.

Puzhen delivered 20 Diesel Railcars with Voith-Powerpacks to Tunisian State Railways.

The company will supply Dongguan Rail Transit with their rolling stock.

Joint Ventures
 Nabtesco for braking systems of high speed train
 Faiveley Transport for braking systems of metro cars
 NTN for railway bearings
 Midas (Singapore) for metro cars
 Alstom for railway propulsion systems, Innovia APM and Innovia Monorail systems

Products

Inter city commuter
 CRH6 (co-manufactured with CRRC Qingdao Sifang, final assembly at Jiangmen factory)

Metro

China
 Changzhou Metro
 Dongguan Rail Transit, line 2 (licensed from Bombardier Transportation)
 Guiyang Urban Rail Transit
 Hangzhou Metro line 2, 4, 6
 Hefei Metro line 1, 2
 MTR-operated lines in mainland China
 Shenzhen Metro Line 4
 Hangzhou Metro Line 1
 Nanjing Metro line 1, 2, 3, 4, S1, S3, S7, S8, S9, 10
 Shanghai Metro line 1, 2, 3, 10, 13, 14, (line 1, 2, 3, 10 licensed from Alstom)
 Shenzhen Metro line 3, 6, 6B, 12
 Suzhou Metro line 1, 2, 3 and 4
 Wuxi Metro line 2
 Xuzhou Metro

Export
 MRT SBK line, Kuala Lumpur, Malaysia – Inspiro (licensed from Siemens)
 Mumbai Metro Line 1, India
 Noida-Greater Noida Metro, India

AGT
 Bukit Panjang LRT line, Singapore – C801B (licensed from Alstom, initially Bombardier)
 BTS Gold Line APM, Bangkok, Thailand (licensed from Alstom, initially Bombardier)

Monorail
 MRT Yellow Line Monorail & Pink Line Monorail, Bangkok, Thailand (licensed from Alstom, initially Bombardier)
 Khon Kaen Transit System, Thailand

Tram/Light Rail
 MTR Light Rail, Hong Kong – Phase  (licensed from UGL Rail) and  LRVs
 Suzhou Tram (licensed from Bombardier Transportation)

References

External links
 

Manufacturing companies based in Nanjing
CRRC Group